Paula King Norwood is a retired American biostatistician who worked in the pharmaceutical industry on statistical aspects of drug development and clinical trials. She is a Fellow of the American Statistical Association, and a former chair of the Biopharmaceutical Section of the American Statistical Association.

Education and career
Norwood attended Clarksville High School in Clarksville, Arkansas, and graduated in 1968 from Hendrix College in Conway, Arkansas with a major in mathematics. She has a master's degree in biostatistics from the University of Arkansas for Medical Sciences, and completed her Ph.D. in 1974 at Virginia Tech; her dissertation, Statistical Analysis of Association between Disease and Genotype, was supervised by Klaus Hinkelmann.

Norwood founded the statistics department of Ortho Pharmaceutical, and became Vice President of Global Biostatistics and Data Processing for Johnson & Johnson. She served as chair of the Biopharmaceutical Section of the American Statistical Association in 1986.

Recognition
Norwood was elected as a Fellow of the American Statistical Association in 1994.

References

External links

Year of birth missing (living people)
Living people
American statisticians
Women statisticians
Hendrix College alumni
University of Arkansas for Medical Sciences alumni
Virginia Tech alumni
Fellows of the American Statistical Association